Blissard is the fifth full-length studio album by the Norwegian band Motorpsycho. It was the first where the band tried to bring some more focused and pre-written songs to tape, as opposed to their earlier working technique of doing lot of experimentation and brainstorming in the studio. It is often ranked among their best works by fans and critics.

Track listing

LP track listing
Blissard was also released on heavy-weight double vinyl to be played at 45 rpm. The track listing was as follows.

Track listing 2012 4-CD reissue
A 4-disc deluxe edition was released 23. November 2012 by Rune Grammofon, and includes the original album, the KiT-sessions, an additional mix of the original album with different track listing, as well as a fourth disc with B-sides and rarities.

Disc 1: The Original Album
Sinful, Wind-borne
"Drug Thing"
Greener
's Numbness
The Nerve Tattoo
True Middle
S.T.G.
Manmower
Fool's Gold
Nathan Daniel's Tune From Hawaii

Disc 2: When the World Sleeps (The KiT-sessions, 1994)
Stalemate
Flick of the Wrist
When the World Sleeps
Black W'abbit
The Ballad of Patrick & Putrick
7th Dream
Mad Sun

Disc 3: The Pidah Mixes
Sinful, Wind-borne
"Drug Thing"
Greener
The Matter With Her
's Numbness
The Nerve Tattoo
Manmower
Like Always
True Middle
S.T.G.
Stalemate

Disc 4: The Ones That Got Away B-sides, rehearsal tapes, the Atlantis psychosis files...
The Nerve Tattoo
Of Beacons & Beams
The Wheel
Pale Day
Mad Sun (short version)
A Saw Sage Full of Secretion
Heaven and Hell
Sterling Says
Never Judge
Baby Scooter
In the Midst of All That
Silver Tongue
Dave Gave Up
That Dying Breed
"Drug Thing"
A Shortcut to the Stars
La Luna
Atlantis Swing
Familjen tar plats i studion/Fyra kvällar session
Jazz på trøndska

Personnel
Bent Sæther: vocals, bass, guitars, taurus,
Hans Magnus Ryan: lead and rhythm guitars, vocals, taurus, banjo
Håkon Gebhardt: drums
Morten Fagervik: rhythm guitars, mellotron, clavinette, viscount organ, piano, vibraphone, vocals

with:
Helge Sten (Deathprod): samples, echoplex, oscillator, theremin
Ole Henrik Moe (Ohm): saw, violins
Bitten Forsudd: backing vocals
Rolf Yngve Uggen: backing vocals
Matt Burt: voice
M. Banto: pandeiro

Book
The deluxe edition released in 2012 was accompanied by a 330-page book about the album, written by Norwegian author Johan Harstad. The book was released in both hardback (limited to 980 copies) and pocket editions. The book was published by Falck forlag, as a part of an ongoing series of books related to Morgenbladets list of the hundred best Norwegian albums.

1996 albums
Motorpsycho albums